Gamma 2 is Gamma's second album, released in 1980. On this album Ronnie Montrose keeps his streak of not having the same personnel on two albums in a row, changing the line-up once again. Davey Pattison (vocals), Montrose (guitar), and Jim Alcivar (synthesizer) remain from Gamma 1. Glenn Letsch replaces Alan Fitzgerald on bass and old Montrose bandmate Denny Carmassi replaces Skip Gillette on drums.

Track listing
Side one
"Mean Streak" (Ronnie Montrose, Davey Pattison, Jim Alcivar) – 4:50
"Four Horsemen" (Montrose, Pattison) – 4:48
"Dirty City" (Montrose, Pattison) – 4:04
"Voyager" (Montrose, Pattison) – 5:23

Side two
"Something in the Air" (John "Speedy" Keen) – 3:17
"Cat on a Leash" (Montrose, Jerry Stahl) – 4:03
"Skin and Bone" (Montrose, Stahl) – 4:48
"Mayday" (Montrose, Alcivar) – 5:37

Personnel
All credits adapted from the original release.

Gamma
Davey Pattison – lead vocals
Ronnie Montrose – guitar, producer
Jim Alcivar – keyboards
Glenn Letsch – bass guitar
Denny Carmassi – drums

Additional musicians
Genya Ravan – additional vocals on "Dirty City"

Production
Gary Lyons – producer, engineer, mixing at Mediasound Studios, New York City
Ken Kessie, Peter Thea, Wayne Lewis – assistant engineers
George Marino – mastering at Sterling Sound, New York

References

Gamma (band) albums
1980 albums
Elektra Records albums